Unit Peneraju Agenda Bumiputera (TERAJU) was established in 2011 under the Prime Minister's Department as a strategic organisation whose role is to lead, coordinate and drive the Bumiputera Agenda aimed at increasing the empowerment of Bumiputera in the national economy.

Presently, TERAJU's function has been expanded as the Main Coordinator of the high-trajectory Bumiputera Socio-Economic Agenda, through strategic interventions, initiatives and programs based on priority areas in the Bumiputera Development Action 2030 (TPB2030) in line with the Shared Prosperity Vision 2030 (WKB 2030) and the Twelfth Malaysia Plan. (RMK-12). TERAJU's role is to encourage Bumiputera participation in high-impact strategic industries towards creating a sustainable Bumiputera development ecosystem, with a fair, equitable, and inclusive economic distribution.

TERAJU is also responsible for driving aspects of well-being and sustainability of life such as education, health, social security and sustainability to create a comfortable and dynamic environment, as well as elevate the dignity of Bumiputera to a higher level

Throughout its establishment, TERAJU has managed to create a value of RM146.32 billion for Bumiputeras, RM14.79 billion for private investment and recorded RM10.07 billion in market capitalisation from the listing of Bumiputera companies on Bursa Malaysia.

References

External links 
 TERAJU official website

Prime Minister's Department (Malaysia)
Economy of Malaysia
Society of Malaysia